The Kaicene Honor S originally named the Oushang Honor or Oushang Ounuo (欧诺) is a 7-seater Compact MPV produced by Changan Automobile and originally sold under the Chana or Oushang brand and later the Kaicene brand.

Overview
The Chana Honor debuted on the 2011 Guangzhou Auto Show and was launched on the Chinese auto market right after with prices ranging from 44,900 yuan to 60,900 yuan at launch. The Honor is manufactured by Chana, Changan’s commercial division, also later known as Oushang. 

Engines of the Chana Honor includes a 1.3 liter inline 4 petrol engine and a 1.5 liter inline 4 petrol engine, with both mated to a 5-speed manual gearbox.

Oushang Honor S

An updated version called the Oushang Honor S was unveiled in December 2017, featuring a completely restyled front and rear end design and a redesigned interior. The price range of the Honor S has also been lowered compared to the previous Honor, with pricing ranging from 39,900 yuan to 55,900 yuan.

References

External links

Official website 

Oushang Honor
Compact MPVs
Front-wheel-drive vehicles
Cars of China
Cars introduced in 2011